was a  after Ōtoku and before Kahō. This period spanned the years from April 1087 through December 1094. The reigning emperor was Emperor Horikawa (堀河天皇).

Change of era
 February 6, 1087 : The new era name was created to mark an event or series of events. The previous era ended and the new one commenced in Ōtoku 4, on the 7th day of the 4th month of 1087.

Events of the Kanji era
 1087 (Kanji 1, 5th month):  Daijō-tennō Shirakawa retired himself to Uji.
 1088 (Kanji 2, 1st month): The emperor paid a visit to his father's home.
 1088 (Kanji 2, 10th month): Shirakawa visited the temples at Mt. Hiei.
 January 28, 1088 (Kanji 2, 14th day of the 12th month): The sesshō Fujiwara Morozane was given additional honors with the further title of daijō-daijin. In this context, it matters a great deal that the mother of Emperor Horikowa, formerly the daughter of udaijin Minamoto no Akifusa, was also formerly the adopted child of Morozane.
 1089 (Kanji 3, 5th month): Shirakawa made a second visit to Mt. Hiei; and this time, he stayed seven days.
 1090 (Kanji 4, 12th month): Fujiwara Morozane was relieved of his responsibilities as sesshō and he was simultaneously named kampaku.
 March 26, 1094 (Kanji 8, 8th day of the 3rd month):  Morozane resigned from his position as kampaku.

Notes

References
 Brown, Delmer M. and Ichirō Ishida, eds. (1979).  Gukanshō: The Future and the Past. Berkeley: University of California Press. ;  OCLC 251325323
 Nussbaum, Louis-Frédéric and Käthe Roth. (2005).  Japan encyclopedia. Cambridge: Harvard University Press. ;  OCLC 58053128
 Titsingh, Isaac. (1834). Nihon Ōdai Ichiran; ou,  Annales des empereurs du Japon.  Paris: Royal Asiatic Society, Oriental Translation Fund of Great Britain and Ireland. OCLC 5850691
 Varley, H. Paul. (1980). A Chronicle of Gods and Sovereigns: Jinnō Shōtōki of Kitabatake Chikafusa. New York: Columbia University Press. ;  OCLC 6042764

External links
 National Diet Library, "The Japanese Calendar" -- historical overview plus illustrative images from library's collection

Japanese eras